The 1964 Alaskan earthquake, also known as the Great Alaskan earthquake and Good Friday earthquake, occurred at 5:36 PM AKST on Good Friday, March 27. Across south-central Alaska, ground fissures, collapsing structures, and tsunamis resulting from the earthquake caused about 131 deaths.

Soil liquefaction, fissures, landslides, and other ground failures caused major structural damage in several communities and much damage to property.

In Prince William Sound, Port Valdez suffered a massive underwater landslide, resulting in the deaths of 32 people between the collapse of the Valdez city harbor and docks, and inside the ship that was docked there at the time. Nearby, a  tsunami destroyed the village of Chenega, killing 23 of the 68 people who lived there; survivors out-ran the wave, climbing to high ground. Post-quake tsunamis severely affected Whittier, Seward, Kodiak, and other Alaskan communities, as well as people and property in British Columbia, Washington, Oregon, and California. Tsunamis also caused damage in Hawaii and Japan. Evidence of motion directly related to the earthquake was also reported from Florida and Texas.

Geology
On March 27, 1964, at 5:36 p.m. AKST (3:36 a.m. UTC), a fault between the Pacific and North American plates ruptured near College Fjord in Prince William Sound. Large rockslides were also caused, resulting in great property damage. Vertical displacement of up to  occurred, affecting an area of  within Alaska.

Studies of ground motion have led to a peak ground acceleration estimate of 0.14–0.18 g.

The Alaska earthquake was a subduction zone (megathrust) earthquake, caused by an oceanic plate sinking under a continental plate. The fault responsible was the Aleutian Megathrust, a reverse fault caused by a compressional force. This caused much of the uneven ground which is the result of ground shifted to the opposite elevation.

Tsunamis

Two types of tsunami were produced by this subduction zone earthquake. There was a tectonic tsunami produced in addition to about 20 smaller and local tsunamis. These smaller tsunamis were produced by submarine and subaerial landslides and were responsible for the majority of the tsunami damage. Tsunami waves were noted in over 20 countries, including Peru, New Zealand, Papua New Guinea, Japan, Mexico, and in the continent of Antarctica.

Death toll, damage, and casualties

As a result of the earthquake, 131 people are believed to have died: Nine died as a result of the earthquake itself and another 122 died from the subsequent tsunami all over the world. Five died from the tsunami in Oregon, and 12 died from the tsunami in Crescent City, California.

The quake was a reported XI on the modified Mercalli Intensity scale "indicating major structural damage, and ground fissures and failures". Property damage was estimated at $116 million ($ billion in  dollars). It is likely that the toll would have been much higher had the quake not occurred after 5 p.m. on Good Friday.

Anchorage area
Anchorage was not hit by tsunamis, but downtown Anchorage was heavily damaged, and parts of the city built on sandy bluffs overlying "Bootlegger Cove clay" near Cook Inlet, most notably the Turnagain neighborhood, suffered landslide damage. The neighborhood lost 75 houses in the landslide, and the destroyed area has since been turned into Earthquake Park. The Government Hill school suffered from the Government Hill landslide, leaving it in two jagged, broken pieces. Land overlooking the Ship Creek valley near the Alaska Railroad yards also slid, destroying many acres of buildings and city blocks in downtown Anchorage. Most other areas of the city were only moderately damaged. The  concrete control tower at Anchorage International Airport was not engineered to withstand earthquake activity and collapsed, killing William George Taylor, the Federal Aviation Agency air traffic controller on duty in the tower cab at the time the earthquake began.

One house on W. 10th Avenue suffered peripheral damage, but only one block away the recently completed (and still unoccupied) Four Seasons Building on Ninth Avenue collapsed completely, with the concrete elevator shafts sticking up out of the rubble like a seesaw.

Girdwood was relocated inland and Portage was abandoned. About  of the Seward Highway sank below the high-water mark of Turnagain Arm; the highway and its bridges were raised and rebuilt in 1964–66.

Elsewhere in Alaska

Most coastal towns in the Prince William Sound, Kenai Peninsula, and Kodiak Island areas, especially the major ports of Seward, Whittier and Kodiak were heavily damaged by a combination of seismic activity, subsidence, post-quake tsunamis and/or earthquake-caused fires. Some Alaska Native villages, including Chenega and Afognak, were destroyed or damaged. The earthquake caused the Cold-War era ballistic missile detection radar of Clear Air Force Station to go offline for six minutes, the only unscheduled interruption in its operational history. Near Cordova, the Million Dollar Bridge crossing the Copper River also suffered damage, with Span #4 slipping off its pylon and collapsing. The community of Girdwood was also confined to the southern side of the Seward Highway when water rushed into Turnagain Arm and flooded or destroyed any buildings left standing to the north of the highway. Only the ground immediately along the highway and that on the north side of the road dropped, prompting geologists to speculate that Girdwood may rest upon an ancient cliff face covered by thousands of years of sediment and glacial deposits.

Canada
A  wave reached Prince Rupert, British Columbia, just south of the Alaska Panhandle, about three hours after the earthquake. The tsunami then reached Tofino, on the exposed west coast of Vancouver Island, and traveled up a fjord to hit Port Alberni twice, washing away 55 homes and damaging 375 others. The towns of Hot Springs Cove, Zeballos, and Amai also saw damage. The damage in British Columbia was estimated at CA$10 million ($ in  Canadian dollars or $ in  US dollars).

Elsewhere

Twelve people were killed by the tsunami in or near Crescent City, California, while four children were killed on the Oregon coast at Beverly Beach State Park. Other coastal towns in the U.S. Pacific Northwest and Hawaii were damaged. Minor damage to boats occurred as far south as Los Angeles. Effects of the earthquake were even noted as far east as Freeport, Texas, where tide gauges recorded waves similar to seismic surface waves. Seiches were detected in wells in countries around the world, including England, Namibia, and Australia.

Aftershocks
There were hundreds of aftershocks in the first weeks following the main shock. In the first day alone, eleven major aftershocks were recorded with a magnitude greater than 6.0. Nine more struck over the next three weeks. In all, thousands of aftershocks occurred in the months following the quake, and smaller aftershocks continued to strike the region for more than a year.

Recovery efforts
Alaska had never experienced a major disaster in a highly populated area before, and had very limited resources for dealing with the effects of such an event. In Anchorage, at the urging of geologist Lidia Selkregg, the City of Anchorage and the Alaska State Housing Authority appointed a team of 40 scientists, including geologists, soil scientists, and engineers, to assess the damage done by the earthquake to the city. The team, called the Engineering and Geological Evaluation Group, was headed by Dr. Ruth A. M. Schmidt, a geology professor at the University of Alaska Anchorage. The team of scientists came into conflict with local developers and downtown business owners who wanted to immediately rebuild; the scientists wanted to identify future dangers to ensure that rebuilt infrastructure would be safe. The team produced a report on May 8, 1964, just a little more than a month after the earthquake.

The United States military, which has a large active presence in Alaska, also stepped in to assist within moments of the end of the quake. The U.S. Army rapidly re-established communications with the lower 48 states, deployed troops to assist the citizens of Anchorage, and dispatched a convoy to Valdez. On the advice of military and civilian leaders, President Lyndon B. Johnson declared all of Alaska a major disaster area the day after the quake. The U.S. Navy and U.S. Coast Guard deployed ships to isolated coastal communities to assist with immediate needs. Bad weather and poor visibility hampered air rescue and observation efforts the day after the quake, but on Sunday the 29th the situation improved and rescue helicopters and observation aircraft were deployed. A military airlift immediately began shipping relief supplies to Alaska, eventually delivering  of food and other supplies. Broadcast journalist, Genie Chance, assisted in recovery and relief efforts, staying on the KENI air waves over Anchorage for more than 24 continuous hours as the voice of calm from her temporary post within the Anchorage Public Safety Building. She was effectively designated as the public safety officer by the city's police chief. Chance provided breaking news of the catastrophic events that continued to develop following the magnitude 9.2 earthquake, and she served as the voice of the public safety office, coordinating response efforts, connecting available resources to needs around the community, disseminating information about shelters and prepared food rations, passing messages of well-being between loved ones, and helping to reunite families.

In the longer term, the U.S. Army Corps of Engineers led the effort to rebuild roads, clear debris, and establish new townsites for communities that had been completely destroyed, at a cost of $110 million. The West Coast and Alaska Tsunami Warning Center was formed as a direct response to the disaster. Federal disaster relief funds paid for reconstruction as well as financially supporting the devastated infrastructure of Alaska's government, spending hundreds of millions of dollars that helped keep Alaska financially solvent until the discovery of massive oil deposits at Prudhoe Bay. At the order of the U.S. Defense Department, the Alaska National Guard founded the Alaska Division of Emergency Services to respond to any future disasters.

See also

2018 Anchorage earthquake
1965 Rat Islands earthquake
List of megathrust earthquakes
List of earthquakes in 1964
List of earthquakes in Alaska
List of earthquakes in the United States

Notes

References

Specific

General

 
 Geology, Seismology and Geodesy, Hydrology, Biology, Oceanography And Coastal Engineering, Engineering, Human Ecology, Summary and Recommendation

External links

 The Face of Disaster: The Great Alaska Earthquake – US Office of Civil Defense
 1964 Good Friday Great Alaskan Earthquake – University of Arizona, Department of Geosciences
 1964 Great Alaska Earthquake – United States Geological Survey
 The Effects of the March 28, 1964 Alaska Tsunami in British Columbia, Canada – George Pararas-Carayannis
 The Great Alaska Earthquake of 1964 – Alaska Earthquake Information Center
 
 Anchorage, AK Good Friday Earthquake, Mar 1964  – GenDisasters.com
 Tsunami Anniversary  – Oregon Field Guide
 Fifty Years Since the Great Alaska Earthquake: The Role of First Responders in Catastrophic Disaster Planning – 113th United States Congress
 Tsunami Forecast Model Animation: Alaska 1964 – Pacific Tsunami Warning Center
 

1964 earthquakes
1964 in Alaska
1964 in Canada
1964 in Hawaii
1964 Alaska
Landslides in the United States
1964 Alaska
1964 Alaska
1964 tsunamis
1964 Alaska
1964 Alaska
Articles containing video clips
Alaska earthquake
1964 natural disasters in the United States
March 1964 events in the United States
1964 in British Columbia
1964 disasters in Canada
History of Anchorage, Alaska